Kassim Nakibinge is a businessman and bank executive in Uganda. He is the managing director and chief executive officer of Cairo International Bank, a commercial bank in the country.

Background and education
He was born in the Central Region of Uganda circa 1966. His father is Badru Kakungulu (died 1991), a paternal uncle to Muwenda Mutebi II, the reigning Buganda monarch (since 1993).

He studied at Kabojja Preparatory School and Savio Junior School for his primary education. He attended St. Mary's College Kisubi for his O-Level studies, and Kibuli Secondary School for his A-Level education. He was admitted at the United States International University in San Diego, California to study business administration, graduating with a Bachelor of Arts in business administration. He pursued postgraduate education at the University of Wales in Cardiff, graduating with a Master of Business Administration degree, majoring in finance. In 2014, the University of Lahore in Pakistan bestowed upon him an honorary Doctor of Philosophy degree in recognition of his contribution to the promotion of the education of Muslims in Uganda.

Career
In 1989, he joined the Bank of Uganda as a banking officer, working there until he retired in 2005 as a senior principal banking officer. He then joined Tropical Bank as an acting managing director and he later served as an executive managing director, resigning from that institution in 2013. In February 2016, he was appointed managing director at Cairo International Bank.

Other considerations
He serves as the "titular head" of the Moslems in Uganda. Nakibinge is a married father.

See also
List of banks in Uganda
Banking in Uganda

References

External links
 Webpage of Cairo International Bank

1966 births
 Living people
 Ugandan bankers
 Ugandan businesspeople
 Alumni of the University of Wales
 United States International University alumni
 People from Kampala
Ugandan Muslims
Ugandan chief executives
Ganda people
Ugandan business executives
People from Central Region, Uganda
People educated at St. Mary's College Kisubi